The Hopeful Stakes (ホープフルステークス) is the only Grade 1 middle-distance race for two-year-old thoroughbreds  in the JRA. 
This race was started as the Radio Tampa Hai Sansai Hinba Stakes (Grade 3), a mile race that was held at Hanshin Racecourse for two-year-old fillies. In 1991, not fillies but colts were allowed to run, with the distance extended to the current 2,000 meters. Its name was changed several times (Radio Tampa Hai Sansai Stakes (1991-2000), Radio Tampa Hai Nisai Stakes (2001-2005) and Radio Nikkei Hai Nisai Stakes (2006-2013)). This race was considered important because no other graded race over 2,000 meters for two-year-olds existed in those days. In particular, it was a good chance for horses with ambition for Triple Crown Races to experience a middle-distance race. In fact, some triple crown race winners had previously won this race. Logi Universe (2008) and One and Only (2013) won the Japanese Derby, Victoire Pisa (also Dubai World Cup winner)
(2009) won the Satsuki Shō, and Epiphaneia (2012) won the Kikuka Shō.

In 2014, the Asahi Hai Futurity Stakes, a grade 1 race for two-year-old colts previously held at Nakayama Racecourse, was moved to Hanshin Racecourse. Then the Radio Nikkei Hai Nisai Stakes was moved to Nakayama Racecourse. With this transfer, its name was changed to Hopeful Stakes, and the grade of the race was elevated to Grade 2. The race was promoted to Grade 1 level in 2017.

The winner in 2016, Rey de Oro, became the Japanese Derby winner in 2017.

Until 2016, this race was held on Arima Kinen day. But since 2017, it was moved to December 28, which is the final day of the JRA racing season.

Winners since 2014

Winners during the Radio Tampa Hai Sansai Himba Stakes era

Winners during the Radio Tampa Hai Sansai Stakes era

Winners during the Radio Tampa Hai Nisai Stakes era

Winners during the Radio NIKKEI Hai Nisai Stakes era

See also
 Horse racing in Japan
 List of Japanese flat horse races

References
Netkeiba.com:
1984, 1985, 1986, 1987, 1988, 1989, 1990, 1991, 1992, 1993, 1994, 1995, 1996, 1997, 1998, 1999, 2000, 2001, 2002, 2003, 2004, 2005, 2006, 2007, 2008, 2009, 2010, 2011, 2012, 2013, 2014, 2015, 2016, 2017, 2018, 2019, 2020, 2021, 2022
Racing Post: 

 JRA Hopeful Stakes

External links 
 Horse Racing in Japan

Flat horse races for two-year-olds
Turf races in Japan